A mood swing is an extreme or sudden change of mood. Such changes can play a positive part in promoting problem solving and in producing flexible forward planning, or be disruptive. When mood swings are severe, they may be categorized as part of a mental illness, such as bipolar disorder, where erratic and disruptive mood swings are a defining feature.

Overview

Speed and extent
Mood swings can happen any time at any place, varying from the microscopic to the wild oscillations of bipolar disorder, so that a continuum can be traced from normal struggles around self-esteem, through cyclothymia, up to a depressive disease. However most people's mood swings remain in the mild to moderate range of emotional ups and downs. The duration of bipolar mood swings also varies. They may last a few hours – ultrarapid – or extend over days – ultradian: clinicians maintain that only when four continuous days of hypomania, or seven days of mania, occur, is a diagnosis of bipolar disorder justified. In such cases, mood swings can extend over several days, even weeks: these episodes may consist of rapid alternation between feelings of depression and euphoria.

Causes
There can be many different causes for mood swings. Some mood swings can be classified as normal/healthy reactions, such as grief processing, adverse effects of substances/drugs, or a result of sleep deprivation. Mood swings can also be a sign of psychiatric illnesses in the absence of external triggers or stressors.

Changes in a person's energy level, sleep patterns, self-esteem, sexual function, concentration, drug or alcohol use can be signs of an oncoming mood disorder.

Other major causes of mood swings (besides bipolar disorder and major depression) include diseases/disorders which interfere with nervous system function. Attention deficit hyperactivity disorder (ADHD), epilepsy, and autism spectrum are three such examples.

The hyperactivity sometimes accompanied by inattentiveness, impulsiveness, and forgetfulness are cardinal symptoms associated with ADHD. As a result, ADHD is known to bring about usually short-lived (though sometimes dramatic) mood swings. The communication difficulties associated with autism, and the associated changes in neurochemistry, are also known to cause autistic fits (autistic mood swings). The seizures associated with epilepsy involve changes in the brain's electrical firing, and thus may also bring about striking and dramatic mood swings. If the mood swing is not associated with a mood disorder, treatments are harder to assign. Most commonly, however, mood swings are the result of dealing with stressful and/or unexpected situations in daily life.

Degenerative diseases of the human central nervous system such as Parkinson's disease, Alzheimer's disease, multiple sclerosis, and Huntington's disease may also produce mood swings. Celiac disease can also affect the nervous system and mood swings can appear.

Not eating on time can contribute, or eating too much sugar, can cause fluctuations in blood sugar, which can cause mood swings.

Brain chemistry
If a person has an abnormal level of one or several of certain neurotransmitters (NTs) in their brain, it may result in having mood swings or a mood disorder. Serotonin is one such neurotransmitter that is involved with sleep, moods, and emotional states. A slight imbalance of this NT could result in depression. Norepinephrine is a neurotransmitter that is involved with learning, memory, and physical arousal.  Like serotonin, an imbalance of norepinephrine may also result in depression.

List of conditions known to cause mood swings

 Anabolic steroid abuse
 Attention deficit hyperactivity disorder
 Autism or other pervasive developmental disorder
 Bipolar disorder or cyclothymia
 Borderline personality disorder
 Dementia, including Alzheimer's disease, Parkinson's disease and Huntington's disease
Dopamine dysregulation syndrome
 Epilepsy
 Hypothyroidism or hyperthyroidism
 Intermittent explosive disorder
 Menopause
 Major depression
 Post traumatic stress disorder
 Pregnancy
 Premenstrual syndrome
 Schizoaffective disorder
 Schizophrenia
 Seasonal affective disorder
 XXYY syndrome

Treatment
Cognitive behavioral therapy recommends using emotional dampeners to break the self-reinforcing tendencies of either manic or depressive mood swings.
Exercise, treats, seeking out small (and easily attainable) triumphs, and using vicarious distractions like reading or watching TV, are among the techniques found to be regularly used by people in breaking depressive swings.

Learning to bring oneself down from grandiose states of mind, or up from exaggerated shame states, is part of taking a proactive approach to managing one's own moods and varying sense of self-esteem.

See also

References

Further reading
 Ronald R. Fieve, Moodswing (1989)
 Susanne P. Schad-Somers, On mood swings (1990)

External links

 Understanding mood swings

Borderline personality disorder
Mood disorders
Symptoms and signs of mental disorders